Northcross is a northern suburb of the North Shore in the contiguous Auckland metropolitan area in New Zealand. It is located in the East Coast Bays, a string of small suburbs that make up the northern North Shore. It is located north of the Waitematā Harbour and is currently under local governance of Auckland Council.

The suburb houses East Coast Bays who are current Champions of the 2010 Lotto Sport Italia NRFL Premier.

Demographics

Northcross had a population of 3,276 at the 2018 New Zealand census, an increase of 57 people (1.8%) since the 2013 census, and an increase of 144 people (4.6%) since the 2006 census. There were 1,080 households, comprising 1,626 males and 1,647 females, giving a sex ratio of 0.99 males per female. The median age was 37.1 years (compared with 37.4 years nationally), with 579 people (17.7%) aged under 15 years, 711 (21.7%) aged 15 to 29, 1,599 (48.8%) aged 30 to 64, and 384 (11.7%) aged 65 or older.

Ethnicities were 69.5% European/Pākehā, 5.2% Māori, 1.6% Pacific peoples, 27.4% Asian, and 3.3% other ethnicities. People may identify with more than one ethnicity.

The percentage of people born overseas was 51.2, compared with 27.1% nationally.

Although some people chose not to answer the census's question about religious affiliation, 53.7% had no religion, 35.4% were Christian, 1.0% were Hindu, 0.4% were Muslim, 1.7% were Buddhist and 1.9% had other religions.

Of those at least 15 years old, 837 (31.0%) people had a bachelor's or higher degree, and 255 (9.5%) people had no formal qualifications. The median income was $38,300, compared with $31,800 nationally. 588 people (21.8%) earned over $70,000 compared to 17.2% nationally. The employment status of those at least 15 was that 1,467 (54.4%) people were employed full-time, 408 (15.1%) were part-time, and 90 (3.3%) were unemployed.

Association football
Northcross is home to East Coast Bays who compete in the Lotto Sport Italia NRFL Premier.

Education
Northcross Intermediate is an intermediate (years 7–8) school with a roll of  students as of  Sherwood School is a contributing primary (years 1–6) school with a  students as of  Sherwood celebrated its 25th anniversary in 2001.

Both schools are coeducational. The two sites are separated by playing fields. After school care for children at Northcross is provided at Sherwood.

Notes

External links
 Northcross Intermediate website
 Sherwood School website

Suburbs of Auckland
North Shore, New Zealand